Gateway Energy Storage is a large-scale lithium-ion battery, operated by grid infrastructure developer LS Power. 
It has a storage capacity of 250 MWh, and it is located in Otay Mesa, California, on the outskirts of San Diego. It uses cells from LG Chem.

The purpose of the battery is to provide power during times of peak demand after being charged with solar power during the day.

References 

Battery (electricity)
Power stations in California